Iva Majoli was the defending champion, but lost in second round to Elena Dementieva.

Justine Henin-Hardenne won the title, defeating Serena Williams 6–3, 6–4 in the final. It was the 2nd title of the year for Henin-Hardenne and the 8th of her career.

Seeds
The first nine seeds received a bye into the second round.

Draw

Finals

Top half

Section 1

Section 2

Bottom half

Section 3

Section 4

External links
 Main and Qualifying draws

Family Circle Cup
Charleston Open